Human form may refer to:

 Human figure, the artistic study of human body shape
 Figure drawing, a drawing of the human form
 Human guise, the concept in mythology and fiction for a being to take human appearance